The Juan de Fuca Cable Project is a proposed 550 MW, 150 kV high-voltage direct current (HVDC) submarine power cable connection running  under the Strait of Juan de Fuca between Port Angeles, Washington, and Victoria, British Columbia. The project's final environmental impact statement (required by United States law) was completed in October 2007, and a presidential permit issued in June 2008.

Sea Breeze Pacific Juan de Fuca Cable LP is proposing to install a high voltage direct current electric power transmission line between Vancouver Island in Canada and Port
Angeles on the Olympic Peninsula in the United States. This 550-megawatt transmission line would cross the international border beneath the Strait of Juan de Fuca, and
would be constructed using a combination of underground and submarine cables.

A benefit of the interconnection is relieving congestion on the US–Canada interconnect. Under the Columbia River Treaty, in return for regulating the flow of the Columbia River in BC, the United States is obliged to return some of the additional electricity generated in Washington to BC.

Two converter stations would be built for connection to power grids in the United States and Canada. One would be at Port Angeles adjacent to an existing Bonneville Power Administration (BPA) substation. One would be at the Pike Lake substation near Victoria.

If built, it would be the third HVDC system in the Pacific Northwest, along with the Pacific DC Intertie and HVDC Vancouver Island. The system would enable a more stable renewable energy supply by allowing bidirectional exchange of power based on renewable sources such as wind, hydro and solar, for which both supply and demand vary across wide areas based on seasonal and other factors. British Columbia's wind power is considered an underdeveloped resource.

As of late 2013, the project was waiting for completion of a $69 per megawatt hour power purchase agreement with BC Hydro, and would need recertification by Canadian energy regulators. At the same time, the provincial government was considering a plan from BC Hydro to supply energy at $83 per megawatt hour.

See also
 HVDC Vancouver Island
 
 List of HVDC projects

References

Sources

External links

Project document library at BPA

Proposed electric power infrastructure in North America
Energy infrastructure in Washington (state)
Electric power transmission systems in Canada
HVDC transmission lines
Western Interconnection
Proposed electric power transmission systems
BC Hydro
Cable Project
Proposed electric power infrastructure in Canada
Proposed electric power infrastructure in the United States